Kotelnicheskaya Embankment Building is one of seven Stalinist skyscrapers laid down in September 1947 and completed in 1952, designed by Dmitry Chechulin (then Chief Architect of Moscow) and Andrei Rostkovsky. At the time of construction it was the tallest building in Europe.

The building also incorporates a 9-story apartment block facing Moskva River, designed by the same architects in 1938 and completed in 1940. Initially built in stern early Stalinist style, with wet stucco wall finishes, it was re-finished in terracotta panels in line with the central tower and acquired ornate pseudo-Gothic crowns over its 12-story raised corners and center tower. By the end of World War II, the side wing was converted to multi-family kommunalka housing, in contrast to the planned elite status of the central tower.

The central tower, of a conventional steel frame structural type, has a hexagonal cross-section with three side wings (18 stories, including two mechanical floors). While it is not exceptionally tall or massive, the "upward surge" of five stepped-up layers, from a flat 9-story side wing to the spire, gives the impression of a more massive structure. The structure hides behind itself a so-called "Shvivaya Gorka," a hill with historical architecture and a maze of steeply inclined streets. Chechulin was initially criticized for complete disregard of this area, but his bureaucratic influence brushed off any criticisms.

Notable residents 
Notable residents of the building include(d):
 Vasily Aksyonov
 Yuri Lyubimov
 Konstantin Paustovsky
 Faina Ranevskaya
 Igor Shuvalov
 Willi Tokarev
 Aleksandr Tvardovsky 
 Galina Ulanova 
 Andrey Voznesensky
 Yevgeny Yevtushenko
 Lyudmila Zykina

Notes

External links
 Building data at emporis.com
 History of Moscow Skyscrapers 
 video from top of building

Office buildings completed in 1940
Residential buildings completed in 1952
Stalinist architecture
Seven Sisters (Moscow)
Residential skyscrapers in Moscow
Skyscraper office buildings in Moscow
Cultural heritage monuments of regional significance in Moscow